Farès Bahlouli (born 8 April 1995) is a French professional footballer who plays as an attacking midfielder or winger for Ukrainian Premier League club Dnipro-1. He is a former France youth international.

Club career

Lyon
Bahlouli started his career at Lyon, graduating through the academy before featuring for Lyon B in 2012. He made his debut for Lyon on 12 May 2013 against Paris Saint-Germain.

Monaco
On 30 June 2015, Bahlouli joined Monaco from Lyon for €3.5 million (plus incentives). Bahlouli scored his first goal for Monaco in a 10–2 win over JS St Jean Beaulieu in the 2015–16 Coupe de France.

Standard Liège loan
On 31 August 2016, he joined Belgian club Standard Liège on a season-long loan deal. However, he failed to make a single appearance for the senior side.

Lille
On 1 January 2017, Lille OSC and Monaco reached an agreement for the transfer of Bahlouli. He made his debut for Lille against Angers on 11 February 2017 in a 2–1 defeat. He played five games for the club during the course of the second half of the season in all competitions.

During the 2017–18 season, he featured regularly at the start of the season under new head coach Marcelo Bielsa. He scored his first goal on 5 November 2017 in a 3–0 win against Metz, however, was seldom used under new manager Christophe Galtier, in total he played 15 games in all competitions scoring one goal.

Lyon Duchère
After terminating his contract with Lille at the end of 2019, Bahlouli signed with Championnat National club Sporting Club Lyon, also known as Lyon Duchère, for six months. However, he never got his debut for the club's first team, only playing one game for the second team in the Championnat National 3, and for that reason, he left the club at the end of his contract.

International career
Bahlouli has represented France at several age levels up until France U21's. He has also won the  He also won the 2015 Toulon Tournament with France U20's playing alongside Monaco teammate Thomas Lemar. He is eligible for the Algeria national side.

Personal life
His brother Mohamed Bahlouli is also a professional footballer who plays for Lithuanian club FK Kauno Žalgiris.

Honours
France U20
Toulon Tournament: 2015

References

External links
 
 
 
 
 

1995 births
Living people
French footballers
France under-21 international footballers
French expatriate footballers
French sportspeople of Algerian descent
Footballers from Lyon
Association football midfielders
Olympique Lyonnais players
AS Monaco FC players
Lille OSC players
Standard Liège players
Lyon La Duchère players
FC Metalist Kharkiv players
SC Dnipro-1 players
Ligue 1 players
Championnat National 2 players
Championnat National 3 players
Ukrainian First League players
Ukrainian Second League players
France youth international footballers
French expatriate sportspeople in Belgium
Expatriate footballers in Belgium
French expatriate sportspeople in Ukraine
Expatriate footballers in Ukraine